Pisanhari ki Marhia is a Jain temple built in the 15th century and located in the city of Jabalpur in Madhya Pradesh, India. The temple is named after its creator, a local woman who, according to legend, paid for the construction of the temple with the money she saved from milling flour. Many other temples have since been added making this a tirtha.

History
The original temple was contains two pratimas installed in 1442 CE. The name derives from the word "pisanhari", meaning a woman engaged in the work of manual milling of flour. According to legend, Pisanhari was a poor woman who saved enough money from milling flour to construct the temple. A statue of Pisanhari is at the temple's entrance, and the quern stones are still kept on top of the entrance gate of the marhia.

The temple complex includes inscriptions. Though they have not yet been deciphered, they are believed to be from the 14th century.

Architecture 

The Pisanhari ki Marhia temples is a complex of 13 smaller temples including the Samavsaran Mandir, the Manastambha, the Bhagwan Bahubali statue, and the Shri Nandishwar Dweep Jinalaya, among others. The roof of the temple is built in vault fashion, and includes a mandapa (pillared hall) and a two-story garbhagriha (inner sanctuary). The temple houses 152 marble idols of Tirthankara seated in small shrines. The temple is famous for its artwork. The temple features a  idol of Bahubali.

See also 
 Hanumantal Bada Jain Mandir
 Rani Durgawati Museum

References

Citations

Sources

External links 
 

Jain temples in Madhya Pradesh
15th-century Jain temples
Digambara sects